Domsjö Fabriker is a Swedish biorefinery located in Örnsköldsvik that converts raw forest materials into specialty cellulose, lignin, and bio-ethanol. In 2000 it was spun off from the forest company Mo och Domsjö AB (MoDo), of which it had been a part since the early 20th century, and sold to a private consortium.

The Domsjö sulphite mill was started in 1903. In 2015, it produced 220,000 metric tons of cellulose. India's Aditya Birla Group acquired the company for US$340 million in 2011.

References

External links

 Domsjö Fabriker website

Aditya Birla Group
Chemical companies of Sweden
2011 mergers and acquisitions
Companies based in Västernorrland County